Matt Uelmen (born July 31, 1972) is an American video game music composer and sound designer. He is best known for his work in Blizzard Entertainment's Diablo series, which was recognized with the inaugural Excellence in Audio award by the IGDA in 2001. He also worked as a sound designer for the real-time strategy game StarCraft, and worked on World of Warcrafts expansion The Burning Crusade in 2007. From 2009 until the studio's closure in 2017, Matt Uelmen worked as a member of the Runic Games team, as a composer and sound designer for the Torchlight games.

Biography

Early life and work 
Growing up in the South Bay area of Greater Los Angeles, Uelmen began taking piano lessons at age six from his tutor, Lenee Bilski, who provided him with a strong theoretical foundation. At 13 years old, he moved with his family to San Jose, California, where he completed high school. During this time, Uelmen was self-taught, mostly influenced by jazz, classic rock, and classical music, especially Liszt and Debussy while he was in high school, and Miles Davis, Jimi Hendrix and Tom Waits later on. He later diversified his instruments to include the flute, guitar, keyboard and percussion.

He studied at Georgetown University from 1989 to 1993, where he earned the Mary Catherine Mita Prize for his thesis Cannibal Culture, Technology and American music in 1993. During college, he was also a keyboardist in a six-member bar band, where he acquired practical experience and learned about "arrangement, interaction and economy". He began working in video game music in 1994, when he was hired by Condor. His first notable work in this period was on the game Justice League Task Force for Sunsoft, released in 1995 for the Sega Genesis.

Blizzard Entertainment (1996-2008) 
In March 1996, Blizzard Entertainment acquired Condor, which was renamed into Blizzard North. On December 31, 1996, Blizzard released their first game of the company's successful series, Diablo. His work in Diablo was so well received that Uelmen was loaned to Blizzard's StarCraft team (but stayed in Redwood City), where he did sound design; that game was released two years after Diablo, in 1998.

On June 29, 2000, Blizzard launched the second game of the Diablo series, Diablo II. In 2001, Uelmen, who composed the Diablo II Soundtrack, and cinematic soundtrack composers Jason Hayes, Glenn Stafford and Andrea Pessino won the International Game Developers Association award for Excellence in Audio for their work on Diablo II. Continuing his work in the Diablo series, on June 29, 2001, Blizzard launched what would be believed to be the last game of the series, the expansion pack Diablo II: Lord of Destruction. In an interview with Gamasutra, Uelmen was asked about his time at Blizzard between 2001 and 2005. When asked whether he had worked on the earlier version of Diablo III prior to the shutdown of Blizzard North, he responded, "I guess at this point I can say, yes, more or less. Blizzard has always had a number of projects, though, that may or may not see the light of day. Some of those have been talked about, but there definitely was more than one thing going on development-wise at the time."

From 2005 to 2007, Uelmen created some of the sound and music for Blizzard's popular MMORPG, World of Warcrafts expansion pack, World of Warcraft: The Burning Crusade; his work represents the majority of the music in the new area of the game, Outland. He is one of about ten composers who have contributed to World of Warcraft. After his departure from Blizzard, his work was used as the basis for some of the tracks in the Blizzard Entertainment and Eminence Symphony Orchestra collaboration, Echoes of War (2008).

Runic Games and Echtra Games (2009-present) 
In 2009, Uelmen joined the newly formed Runic Games, which includes several former Blizzard North and Flagship Studios employees. He composed the score for their 2009 game, Torchlight and served as sound designer. He continued to work at Runic on Torchlight II, which released in September 2012. Runic Games closed down in November 2017, shortly after releasing Hob.

In 2016, Uelmen followed his former long-time colleague Max Schaefer as he started the new game company Echtra Games. In 2020, he worked on the soundtrack to Torchlight III.

Works 
All works listed below were composed by Uelmen unless otherwise noted

References

External links 

MobyGames profile

1972 births
Living people
Video game composers
American male composers
21st-century American composers
Blizzard Entertainment people
Georgetown University alumni
Musicians from Los Angeles
21st-century American male musicians